Lisa Sheridan (December 5, 1973 – February 25, 2019) was an American actress. Known mainly for her work on television, Sheridan was a regular cast member in cult favorites series such as, FreakyLinks and Invasion.

Life and career
Sheridan was born in Macon, Georgia, where she graduated from Mount de Sales Academy. She attended the Carnegie Mellon School of Drama in Pittsburgh, Pennsylvania.

On television, Sheridan portrayed Chloe Tanner on FreakyLinks, Larkin Groves on Invasion, and Vivian Winters in Legacy. She also appeared on Journeyman. She guest-starred in episodes of various other series, including three episodes each of CSI: Miami and Still the King. Sheridan’s last appearance was the lead role in the 2018 independent film Strange Nature.

Personal life
Sheridan was engaged to actor Ron Livingston until 2003. They met when they worked on the 2000 film Beat.

Death
Sheridan died on February 25, 2019, at the age of 45, at her home in New Orleans.  Three months later, on May 3, the Orleans Parish Coroner's office determined the cause of death to be complications from chronic alcoholism, with Benzodiazepine abuse and a brain injury from an earlier fall being non-contributing factors.

Filmography

Film

Television

References

External links
 
 Lisa Sheridan on Instagram

Lisasheridan.com 

1974 births
2019 deaths
20th-century American actresses
21st-century American actresses
Actresses from Georgia (U.S. state)
American film actresses
American television actresses
Carnegie Mellon University College of Fine Arts alumni
People from Macon, Georgia
Alcohol-related deaths in Louisiana
Deaths from head injury